Afonso Van-Dunem aka M'Binda (7 September 1941 – 14 November 2014) was an Angolan politician. Van-Dunem worked as the MPLA-Workers' Party representative in Zambia and Tanzania from 1970 to 1972, as well as being elected to the Central Committee of the MPLA from 1976 onwards. He was also Minister of External Relations from 1985 to 1989 and Permanent Representative to the United Nations from 1991 to 2000.

Career
While Van-Dunem was Minister of External Relations, he helped to negotiate the agreement that led to the Cuban withdrawal from Angola and the South African withdrawal from Namibia, paving the way for Namibia's independence.

Personal life 
Van-Dunem married Luzia Inglês Van-Dúnem, an MPLA politician and women's rights activist; they had four children.

See also 
List of foreign ministers in 1989 
Foreign relations of Angola

References

External links
 UN.int List and pictures of all former Angolan ambassadors to the United Nations, un.int; accessed 24 November 2014.

1941 births
2014 deaths
Foreign ministers of Angola
Governors of Luanda
Permanent Representatives of Angola to the United Nations
MPLA politicians